The Jaeger was an automobile built in Belleville, Michigan by the Jaeger Motor Car Company from 1932 to 1933.

History 
Charles F. Jaeger patented a novel suspension for automobiles which included two coils in tandem at each wheel separated by the axle mounting. Wire wheels were standard on the vehicle, with a V-radiator grille and three diagonal groups of four louvers on each side of the bonnet. Five coupes and convertible coupes were actually produced. The vehicle sold for $700, .

References

 See additional information at the Ferndale Historical Museum's webpage about the founder, Charles Jaeger.

Defunct motor vehicle manufacturers of the United States
Motor vehicle manufacturers based in Michigan
Vehicle manufacturing companies established in 1932
Companies based in Wayne County, Michigan
Defunct manufacturing companies based in Michigan
1930s cars
Pre-war vehicles
Vehicle manufacturing companies disestablished in 1933
Cars introduced in 1921